The Brossard City Council (in French: Le conseil municipal de Brossard) is the governing body for the mayor–council government in the city of Brossard, Quebec in the Montérégie region. The council consists of the mayor and ten councillors.

Current Brossard City Council 
The Mayor and Councillors listed below were elected in 2021 to serve a term of four years.  The next election is scheduled to take place in 2025.

Source: Brossard Elected Officials
Doreen Assaad, Mayor
Christian Gaudette, District 1 councillor, Sectors C-B
Tina Del Vecchio, District 2 councillor, Sector B
Stéphanie Quintal, District 3 councillor, Sectors A
Patrick Langlois, District 4 councillor, Sectors P-V
Claudio Benedetti, District 5 councillor, Sectors T
Sophie Allard, District 6 councillor, Sector S
Antoine Assaf, District 7 councillor, Sector R
Sissi Lee, District 8 councillor, Sectors I-N-O
Michelle J. Hui, District 9 councillor, Sectors J-L-N-X-Y
Daniel Lucier, District 10 councillor, Sectors L-M

References

External links 
 Brossard City Council

Municipal councils in Quebec
Politics of Brossard